Rióna Ní Fhrighil is an Irish academic and scholar. She lectures in Modern Irish at National University of Ireland, Galway.

Education
Ní Fhrighil earned her Master's degree from Trinity College Dublin and her PhD in Irish from the National University of Ireland, Galway.

Career
She is the co-editor of a peer-reviewed journal titled LÉANN and the principal Irish-language researcher on the project The Representation of Jews in Irish Literature. In 2018, she received a grant to continue researching Human Rights and Modern Irish Poetry.

Selected bibliography

 Briathra, Béithe agus Banfhilí: Filíocht Eavan Boland agus Nuala Ní Dhomhnaill, 2008
 Aistriú Éireann (eds. with Charlie Dillon), 2008
 Ó Theagasc Teanga go Sealbhú Teanga, (eds. with Máirín Nic Eoin), 2009
 Filíocht Chomhaimseartha na Gaeilge, Cois Life, 2010.
 Ó Theagasc Teanga go Sealbhú Teanga: Múineadh agus Foghlaim na Gaeilge ar an Tríú Leibhéal'' (with Máirín Nic Eoin), Cois Life, 2009

References

External links
 http://www.nuigalway.ie/our-research/people/languages-literatures-and-cultures/rionanifhrighil/
 http://www.siopa.ie/en/s-1-books/c-1-university/i-503-o_theagasc_teanga_go_sealbhu_teanga_muineadh_agus_foghlaim_na_gaeilge_ar_an_triu_leibheal/i.aspx?ID=503

21st-century Irish women writers
Living people
Linguists from Ireland
Irish-language writers
Academics of the University of Galway
Year of birth missing (living people)